Darian Cowgill (born November 7, 1972, San Marino, California, United States), is an American audio engineer, mix engineer, mastering engineer, record producer, and Commercial Voice Over Artist.

Career
Darian is an independent audio engineer and co-founder of Atrium Music, with Josh Young,Emmy Award-nominated business partner.  Atrium has been operational since 1998.  Darian and Josh operate Atrium Music, a music licensing and publishing firm that focuses not only on the individual artist, but their continual growth. The Atrium library consists of over 2500 different composers and independent artists licensed for the purpose of placement in television, film, and all broadcast media opportunities.

Darian's musical career began with singing and touring with the Pasadena Boys Choir... followed by many theater performances, solo performances, live sound, and in-studio productions.

In 1998, he began an internship with Warped Tour creator, Kevin Lyman giving Darian a unique insight into the inner workings of the longest-running tour of all time. 

From his foundational experiences, he fell in love with exploring the other side of the studio glass as an engineer and producer and has since produced over 400 unique local, independent, and major label artists to date. 

His work in national and international terrestrial radio began while working as a content producer and production director for Pyramid Radio from 2005 until 2009, under former Radio legend and then CBS president, Steve Rivers and former owner of Boston's Kiss 108 Richie Balsbaugh. Darian was Steve Rivers's last production director before Steve Rivers's untimely passing.  

He has continued to work full time as a mix engineer for Los Angeles Burbank based independent radio syndication company Radio Express... where he continues to mix and produce multiple international top 20 count-down radio format and mix format shows weekly including The World Chart Show with Lara Scott K-Earth and The World Chart Show with PJ Butta. also the Airtel sponsored syndicated English, Spanish, and French shows for various countries worldwide.

He has worked as an independent record producer and engineer for American rock band, Oedipus. He has also worked with a number of other bands as a Producer, Editor, Mixer, and Mastering engineer. Bands included but not limited to Middle Class Rut, Beware of Darkness, Flagship, Zen Robbi, Katastro, The Graves, Kevin Sandbloom, Jonny Santos, Rafael Moreira, When in Rome, Jimmy Gnecco and Sleeping Giant.

In addition to mixing and producing individual single-release songs for artists, complete albums, radio shows, television/film projects, and commercial broadcast content. He is also a currently desired voice artist (short client list below). He is also a current and continued professor of Critical Listening for Engineers, and Digital Audio Technology (advanced Pro-tools) as an AVID Certified Pro Tools instructor with the Citrus College Recording Arts program in Glendora, California.

Education:
Darian Holds a two-year AA/AS in Recording Arts from the Citrus College Recording Arts program, A Bachelor of Science degree in Business/Leadership from Azusa Pacific University, and a Master's Degree in Communications from the University of Southern California.

Awards and accolades
Cowgill was the Grand Prize winner of a Pensado's Place sponsored Indaba Music mix contest, for "Muffaletta" on Billy Martin's 2013, Heels Over Head album. Subsequently, Cowgill was interviewed by Dave Pensado on his weekly show, "Pensado's Place", regarding his victory.

He was a producer on the "Get Your Music in Film and TV" panel at the 32nd Westcoast Songwriter's Conference held in Los Altos, California. He was elected to the board of directors for Westcoastsongwriters.org in June 2014 and will continue to be a guest speaker for the music production, mixing, and mastering seminars.

Darian is also an AVID certified Pro Tools instructor. He also endorses Slate Digital, THD Electronics, Dean Markley Strings and Mesa Boogie.

Partial discography

Mix engineer
Airtel World Chart Show
 Billy Martin – Wicked Knee
Heineken World Chart Show
Vicious Little Smile by Oedipus
One California Day
Rocket 21
Sleeping Giant
The Big Pill
Wait
Women in Film
World Chart Show Urban

Mastering engineer
Beware of Darkness
Flagship
Jelly of the Month Club
Jimmy Gnecco
Middle Class Rut
Zen Robbi
Cheerleader

Voice-over
Advance Auto Parts
Body Worlds Chicago
Bed, Bath & Beyond
CVS Pharmacy
Disney Orlando
Estée Lauder
Finishline
HomeGoods
Knott's Berry Farm
Logan International Airport
Longs Drugs
Marshalls
Massachusetts State Lotto
MTV
Petro Express
Rocket 21
Sony Music
Staples
Telemundo 34
T.J. Maxx
Tulsa International Airport
Unilever Sun Silk
Val Surf

References

Living people
1972 births
Mastering engineers
Record producers from California